Istanbul–Tehran–lslamabad railway or (ITI Train) is an international freight train service between Islamabad, Pakistan and Istanbul, Turkey via Tehran, Iran. The train was launched on 14 August 2009 on trial basis. It is an important project of Economic Cooperation Organization.

The train connects Islamabad, Tehran and Istanbul by covering 6,500 kilometers or 4,040 miles in 15 days. There is a break-of-gauge between Iran Railways, Standard gauge and Pakistan Railways,  broad gauge at Zahedan. A container terminal is proposed in Zahedan for transshipment of containers from Standard gauge to Broad gauge. A passenger train service is also under consideration on this route. The main obstacle in project is the poor railway infrastructure between Quetta and Taftan in Pakistan.

The 10th edition of the joint meetup of Economic Cooperation Organization (ECO) held in Istanbul national railways of Turkey, Iran, and Pakistan have mutually agreed to resume regular operations after a meeting Turkey’s Transport Minister, Adil Karaismailoğlu, informed all requirements for the railway triad have been fulfilled. The train is expected to resume operations in 2021. The Islamabad-Tehran-Istanbul Freight Train Project, which was implemented between Turkey, Iran and Pakistan in 2009 and stopped in 2011, was restarted with the train departing from Islamabad on December 21, 2021. The train reached Ankara with a load of 150 tonnes of pink salt on January 4, 14 days later.

See also
 Trans-Asian Railway

References

International railway lines in Asia
International railway lines in Europe
Rail transport in Pakistan
Rail transport in Iran
Rail freight transport in Turkey